John Pangnark (1920 in Windy Lake, Nunavut – 1980) was an Inuit sculptor and native of Arviat, Northwest Territories (now Nunavut). His work is notable for its frequent use of geometric abstraction and its nearly exclusive focus on the human figure. His work is in the collections of the Dennos Museum Center and the National Gallery of Canada.

References

External links 
 A timeline of Pangnark's work at the Centre for Contemporary Canadian Art
 Entry on the Union List of Artist Names

Inuit sculptors
1920 births
1980 deaths
Inuit from the Northwest Territories
People from Arviat
Artists from Nunavut
20th-century Canadian sculptors